Boldine is an alkaloid of the aporphine class that can be found in the boldo tree and in Lindera aggregata.

References 

Aporphine alkaloids
Phenols
Phenol ethers